Yugoiztochen Planning Region (Southeast Planning Region) is one of Bulgaria's planning regions. The capital is Burgas. It includes Burgas Province, Sliven Province, Yambol Province and Stara Zagora Province.

Mostly inhabited by Bulgarians, it is also contains one of the highest rates of Romani people in the country. It is the least densely populated region in the country. The largest cities are Burgas - 200,000; Stara Zagora - 145,000, Sliven - 98,000; Yambol - 80,000, Kazanlak - 55,000.

Economy
Yugoiztochen is the second richest Bulgarian region. Most important to the economy are tourism, electric power generation, and services. Burgas is the second largest Bulgarian port,  and the biggest tourist centres are Sunny beach, Sozopol, Pomorie, Primorsko, Ravda and Kiten. The main industrial centers are the big cities and towns of Radnevo and Galabovo - electric power generation and mining.

See also 
 NUTS of Bulgaria

References

Regions of Bulgaria